Batlaq (also Romanized as Bāţlāq) is a village in Garmeh-ye Jonubi Rural District, in the Central District of Meyaneh County, East Azerbaijan Province, Iran. At the 2006 census, its population was 70, in 17 families.

References 

Tageo

Populated places in Meyaneh County